Bazaryn Sükhbaatar (born 15 May 1943) is a bantamweight Mongolian wrestler. He competed at the 1964 Summer Olympics and the 1968 Summer Olympics.

References

External links
 

1943 births
Living people
Mongolian male sport wrestlers
Olympic wrestlers of Mongolia
Wrestlers at the 1964 Summer Olympics
Wrestlers at the 1968 Summer Olympics
People from Bulgan Province
20th-century Mongolian people
21st-century Mongolian people